John Tatum may refer to:

John Tatum (scientist) (1772–1858), British silversmith, scientist and philosopher
John Tatum (wrestler) (born 1959), American professional wrestler
John Tatum (Canadian football) (born c. 1935), Canadian football player
Johnny Tatum (died 1992), American rodeo clown and bullfighter
Jack Tatum (1948–2010), American football player